The men's 200 metre breaststroke competition of the swimming events at the 2015 Pan American Games took place on July 15 at the CIBC Pan Am/Parapan Am Aquatics Centre and Field House in Toronto, Canada. The defending Pan American Games champion was Sean Mahoney of the United States.

This race consisted of four lengths of the pool, all lengths in breaststroke. The top eight swimmers from the heats would qualify for the A final (where the medals would be awarded), while the next best eight swimmers would qualify for the B final.

Records
Prior to this competition, the existing world and Pan American Games records were as follows:

The following new records were set during this competition.

Qualification

Each National Olympic Committee (NOC) was able to enter up to two entrants providing they had met the A standard (2:19.49) in the qualifying period (January 1, 2014 to May 1, 2015). NOCs were also permitted to enter one athlete providing they had met the B standard (2:27.86) in the same qualifying period. All other competing athletes were entered as universality spots.

Schedule
All times are Eastern Time Zone (UTC-4).

Results

Heats
The first round was held on July 15.

B Final 
The B final was also held on July 15.

A Final 
The A final was also held on July 15.

References

Swimming at the 2015 Pan American Games